Krishnarajapuram (officially known as K.R.Pura) is an upcoming interchange metro station in Bangalore, India. It is on the east-west corridor of the Purple Line as well as south-north corridor of the upcoming Blue Line of Namma Metro. This is the second interchange metro station after Nadaprabhu Kempegowda Stn., Majestic having interchange with Purple and Green Lines. Around this station, holds the main KR Puram Railway station followed by some locations like KR Puram Hanging Bridge leading towards Hoskote, Tin Factory, ITI General Hospital and many more. This station under Blue Line is planned to be operational around the year 2024 (TBC).

The Whitefield - KR Puram trial runs were successfully conducted (under Purple Line) from 25 October for a month. This section will become operational from March 25 2023.

Station Layout
Purple Line Station Layout - To Be Confirmed
Blue Line Station Layout - To Be Confirmed

Connections
This metro station is connected with Krishnarajapuram of Indian Railways network.

Entry/Exit
There are 2 Entry/Exit points - A and B. Commuters can use either of the points for their travel.

 Entry/Exit point A - Towards KR Puram Railway Station side
 Entry/Exit point B - Towards Whitefield Main Road side

See also
Krishnarajapuram
Bangalore
List of Namma Metro stations
Transport in Karnataka
List of metro systems
List of rapid transit systems in India
Bangalore Metropolitan Transport Corporation

References

External links
 BMRCL English - BMRCL Official Website
 UrbanRail.Net – descriptions of all metro systems in the world, each with a schematic map showing all stations.



Namma Metro stations
Railway stations in India opened in 2011
2011 establishments in Karnataka